Globalization is the eighth studio album by American rapper Pitbull. It was released on November 21, 2014 through Mr. 305, Polo Grounds Music, and RCA Records. The production on the album was handled by multiple producers including Dr. Luke, Cirkut, DJ Frank E, The Monsters and the Strangerz and Max Martin. The album also features guest appearances by Chris Brown, Jason Derulo, Sean Paul, Ne-Yo, Bebe Rexha, G.R.L. and Jennifer Lopez among others.

Globalization was supported by five singles: "Wild Wild Love", "Fireball", "Time of Our Lives", "Fun" and "Drive You Crazy". The album received generally mixed reviews from music critics and was a moderate commercial success. It debuted at number 18  on the US Billboard 200 chart, earning 49,000 album-equivalent units in its first week.

Singles
The album was supported by five singles. The first single, "Wild Wild Love" was released as the album's lead single on February 25, 2014. The song features guest appearances from American-British-Canadian girl group G.R.L. The single peaked at number six on the UK; number ten in Australia and number 30 in the United States. The second single, "Fireball" was released on July 23, 2014. The song features guest appearance from John Ryan. It eventually reached at number one in Netherlands; number six in Spain; number nine in Finland and number 23 in the United States. The third single, "Time of Our Lives" featuring Ne-Yo was released on November 17, 2014. The song reached at number seven in Czech Republic, number nine in United States and Norway; number ten in Canada. The fourth single, "Fun" featuring Chris Brown was released on April 21, 2015. The single peaked at number 40 in the United States. The fifth and final single, "Drive You Crazy" featuring Jason Derulo and Juicy J was released on August 21, 2015.

Other songs
"We Are One (Ole Ola)" was released as official single of the official 2014 FIFA World Cup song on April 15, 2014. It features American singer Jennifer Lopez and Brazilian recording artist Claudia Leitte.

"Celebrate" was released on October 18, 2014. It serves as the lead single for the film Penguins of Madagascar and was used in the commercial for the 2016 edition of CBC's Hockey Day in Canada.  The Philadelphia Phillies play the song after every home victory. These songs were also included on "Globalization".

"Sexy Beaches" was used in the "Visit Florida" tourism campaign, sponsored by the state of Florida. The music video was filmed at The Don CeSar in St. Petersburg, Florida, and was uploaded to Pitbull's YouTube channel on July 13, 2016.

Commercial performance
Globalization debuted at number 18  on the US Billboard 200 chart, earning 49,000 album-equivalent units (including 38,000 copies as pure album sales) in its first week. The album also debuted at number three on the US Top Rap Albums chart. As of September 2016, the album has sold 198,000 copies in the US. On October 16, 2020, the album was certified platinum by the Recording Industry Association of America (RIAA) for combined sales and album-equivalent units of over one million units in the United States.
   
In Canada, the album also debuted at number 16 on the Canadian Albums Chart.

Track listing

Notes
 signifies an additional producer
"Ah Leke" contains elements of "Passinho do Volante (Ah! Lelek Lek Lek)" performed by MC Federado & Os Leleks, and written by MC Federado.
"Celebrate" contains elements of "I Just Want to Celebrate" performed by Rare Earth and written by Dino Fekaris and Nick Zesses.
”Celebrate” Is Featured In The Movie Penguins of Madagascar

Charts

Weekly charts

Year-end charts

Certifications

Release history

References

2014 albums
Pitbull (rapper) albums
RCA Records albums
Albums produced by Cirkut
Albums produced by Max Martin
Albums produced by DJ Frank E
Albums produced by Jason Evigan